Palm is an American art rock band from Philadelphia. Palm was formed by songwriters, guitarists and vocalists Eve Alpert and Kasra Kurt, who recruited bass player Gerasimos Livitsanos and drummer Hugo Stanley while attending Bard College in New York.  

Palm's music often features abrupt time changes and unconventional song structures – they've cited Deerhoof, This Heat, and DJ Rashad as influences. In a positive review of their Shadow Expert EP, Pitchfork referred to their dualing melodies and intertwined vocals as "constantly communicating in esoteric shorthand, often in several cross-talking conversations at once." The New York Times, which called the band "one of the most ambitious and promising acts in today’s art-rock scene," described Palm's music as "teeming with unorthodox time signatures, unexpected bursts of guitar noise, and other trapdoors and tricks." NPR described the band's songs as "jagged edges and complex, interlocking pieces ... that demands – and rewards – your full attention."

Members 
 Eve Alpert – guitar, vocals
 Kasra Kurt – guitar, vocals
 Gerasimos Livitsanos – bass
 Hugo Stanley – drums

Discography 
 Ode to Scott (2013)
 Into The Bulk (2013)
 Ostrich Vacation (2015)
 Trading Basics (2015, Exploding in Sound, Inflated Records)
 Audiotree Live (2016)
 Shadow Expert (2017, Carpark Records)
 Rock Island (2018, Carpark Records)
 Nicks and Grazes (2022, Saddle Creek Records)

References

External links 
 
Rock music groups from Pennsylvania
Indie rock musical groups from Pennsylvania
American experimental rock groups
Musical groups from Philadelphia
2012 establishments in Pennsylvania
Musical groups established in 2012
Musical quartets
Carpark Records artists